McBride Branch is a stream in Owen County, in the U.S. state of Indiana.

McBride Branch was named for a pioneer who settled near the creek.

See also
List of rivers of Indiana

References

Rivers of Owen County, Indiana
Rivers of Indiana